Shawnee Township is a township in Cherokee County, Kansas, USA.  As of the 2000 census, its population was 505.

Geography
According to the USGS, it contains three cemeteries: Messer, Ritchie and Wirtonia.

The streams of Cow Creek, Little Shawnee Creek and Turkey Creek run through this township.

References
 USGS Geographic Names Information System (GNIS)

External links
 US-Counties.com
 City-Data.com

Townships in Cherokee County, Kansas
Townships in Kansas